Brigadier Archibald Charles Melvill Paris,  (28 May 1890 – 3 March 1942) was a British Army officer.

Although he is better known for having died during the events that followed the sinking of the Dutch ship Rooseboom off Sumatra in 1942, he was also one of the few British commanders that put up a good fight against the Japanese during the Battle of Malaya and the subsequent fall of Singapore.

Early life and career
Archibald Paris was born in 1890 in Southsea on Portsea Island, Portsmouth, the son of Major General Sir Archibald Paris, a Royal Marines officer who commanded the Royal Naval Division during the First World War, and of Lillian Jane (née Melvill), daughter of Gen. Henry Melvill  and granddaughter of Rev. Canon Henry Melvill. He was descended from Capt. Philip Melvill on his mother's side.

Paris passed out of the Royal Military College, Sandhurst and was commissioned into the Oxfordshire and Buckinghamshire Light Infantry in 1909. He married Ruth Norton. He served in the First World War, and was awarded the Military Cross (MC) in 1917.

Battle of Malaya
In December 1941, Paris was in command of the 12th Indian Infantry Brigade, part of the Singapore Garrison. When the battle started in northern Malaya, Paris's 12th Brigade was sent to protect the retreat of the Indian 11th Infantry Division, which it did successfully, to the extent that it surprised the Japanese, inflicting high casualties on some of their more overconfident units.

When Lieutenant General Arthur Percival sacked Major General David Murray-Lyon from command of the 11th Indian Division, Paris was given temporary command, until the disastrous Battle of Slim River, when Major General Billy Key took over and Paris resumed command of the 12th Brigade. Paris commanded the 12th Brigade throughout the retreat down Malaya and the subsequent battles on Singapore.

Rooseboom
With Singapore about to surrender in February 1942, Percival attempted to save personnel who were successful at fighting the Japanese and Paris was one of the chosen. His wife had left Singapore a few weeks earlier aboard the SS Lyemoon which was part of a civilian evacuation. He escaped aboard the Dutch ship Rooseboom, which was sunk off Sumatra. Although he survived the sinking along with about 80 other passengers in one lifeboat, he did not survive the shocking 28-day ordeal of drifting 100 miles. There were only five survivors.

This account of the struggle for survival after the sinking of the Rooseboom was based on survivor and Argyll and Sutherland Highlander Walter Gibson's book The Boat:

Paris is commemorated on the Kranji War Memorial in Singapore.

References

External links

Rooseboom Sinking
Generals of World War II

1890 births
1942 deaths
British Army brigadiers of World War II
British Plymouth Brethren
English evangelicals
British Army personnel of World War I
Companions of the Distinguished Service Order
Recipients of the Military Cross
Oxfordshire and Buckinghamshire Light Infantry officers
Military of Singapore under British rule
British Army personnel killed in World War II
Graduates of the Royal Military College, Sandhurst
Melvill family
Military personnel from Portsmouth
People from Portsea, Portsmouth